Marc Haudenschild is a Swiss curler.

At the national level, he is a 1998 Swiss men's champion curler and two-time Swiss junior champion curler (1986, 1988).

Awards
 All-Star Team:

Teams

References

External links

Die besondere Vorschau auf die SM mit Marc Haudenschild vom 7. Februar 2020 in der Thuner Zeitung

Living people
Swiss male curlers
Swiss curling champions
Year of birth missing (living people)